The Kispiox Range is a subrange of the Hazelton Mountains, located between the Kispiox and Kitwanga Rivers in northern British Columbia, Canada.

References

Kispiox Range in the Canadian Mountain Encyclopedia

Hazelton Mountains
Skeena Country